Songs in G is the first EP by the Clarks, released in 2010. It was only released digitally, and it remains that way as of 2013. Aside from the first track (a cover of a Whiskeytown song), the tracks are re-imaginations of older Clarks material.

Track listing
 "16 Days"
 "Tonight"
 "Penny on the Floor"
 "Snowman"
 "Boys Lie" feat. Maddie Georgi 
 "Shimmy Low"

Personnel
 Scott Blasey, lead vocals
 Rob James, guitar and backing vocals
 Greg Joseph, bass and backing vocals
 Dave Minarik, drums
 Maddie Georgi, vocals ("Boys Lie")

References

2010 EPs
The Clarks albums